"Oom-Pah-Pah" is a lively and somewhat risqué show tune with music and lyrics by Lionel Bart and appearing in the 1960 musical Oliver!, when it is sung by Nancy and the crowd at the "Three Cripples" tavern. The word "oom-pah-pah" is seemingly used euphemistically to refer to both intoxication and fornication.  Although not an original music hall song, it recalls that genre well and, in terms of both its tempo and suggestiveness, shares characteristics with such late 19th century songs as "Ta-ra-ra Boom-de-ay".  

In the stage musical, the song opens Act II and does not contribute to the storyline. For the 1968 film version it was moved to near the end and given a dramatic purpose: Bill Sikes has refused to let Nancy take Oliver out of the pub and, unknown to him, to Mr Brownlow and rescue. He orders Bullseye to guard Oliver while he immerses himself in discussion with Fagin, so Nancy starts the song and gradually works the pub crowd into a raucous singalong, hoping their noise will drown out Bullseye's barking long enough for her to get Oliver away.

Songs from Oliver!
Songs written by Lionel Bart
1960 songs